Andreas Zelinka (born 23 February 1802, in Vyškov, Moravia – 21 January 1868, in Vienna) served as the mayor of Vienna, Austria from 1861 to 1868.

Life
Zelinka attended high school in Brno. From 1821 to 1825, he studied law at the University of Vienna and received his PhD in 1829. Beginning in 1831, he worked as a health inspector and an attorney. In 1848, he was elected to the Vienna City Council and became its vice-president in 1849. He was awarded the Franz Joseph Order in 1850. During his years as mayor he also served in the State Parliament of Lower Austria and, from 1867, in the Herrenhaus of the Imperial Council of Austria.

As mayor, he participated in planning the First Vienna Mountain Spring Pipeline, the Wiener Donauregulierung (a flood control project) and the Zentralfriedhof (Central Cemetery). In 1865, the first sections of the Ringstraße were opened. His entire annual salary of 12,000 florins was donated to charity. The people of Vienna called him Papa Zelinka. In 1869, a street in the Innere Stadt was named the Zelinkagasse in his honor. He is also commemorated by a monument in the Stadtpark.

Sources
Article on Zelinka @ German Wikisource.  
 

1802 births
1868 deaths
People from Vyškov
Mayors of Vienna
Austrian people of Czech descent
Members of the House of Lords (Austria)
Burials at the Vienna Central Cemetery